Flurence Dominic Moore (17 November 1890 – 13 December 1953) was an Australian rules football player.

Playing career
After beginning his career for Boulder City in Western Australia, Moore moved to Essendon, playing seven matches during the 1915 VFL season.

References

External links

1890 births
1953 deaths
Essendon Football Club players
Boulder City Football Club players
Australian rules footballers from Western Australia
Australian rules footballers from Melbourne
People from Brunswick, Victoria